Euphorbia globosa, commonly known as globose euphorbia or globose spurge, is a species of plant in the family Euphorbiaceae native to southern Africa.

References 

globosa
globosa